German submarine U-182 was a Type IX D 2 U-boat of Nazi Germany's Kriegsmarine which served in World War II. Her keel was laid down on 7 April 1941 at DeSchiMAG AG Weser, Bremen as yard number 1022; she was launched on 3 March 1942 and commissioned on 30 June of the same year.

She carried out a single war patrol, sinking five merchant vessels and spending 159 days at sea.

The boat had been unsuccessfully attacked by a USAAF B-24 Liberator the previous day.

Design
German Type IXD2 submarines were considerably larger than the original Type IXs. U-182 had a displacement of  when at the surface and  while submerged. She had two shafts and two  propellers.

U-182 was fitted with six  torpedo tubes (four fitted at the bow and two at the stern), 24 torpedoes, one  SK C/32 naval gun, 150 rounds, and a  SK C/30 with 2575 rounds as well as two  C/30 anti-aircraft guns with 8100 rounds. The boat had a complement of fifty-five.

Summary of raiding history

References

Bibliography

External links

 

German Type IX submarines
World War II submarines of Germany
U-boats commissioned in 1942
1942 ships
Ships built in Bremen (state)
U-boats sunk in 1943
World War II shipwrecks in the Atlantic Ocean
Ships lost with all hands
U-boats sunk by depth charges
U-boats sunk by US warships
Maritime incidents in May 1943